Sleeping Girl may refer to:

 Sleeping Girl (Lichtenstein painting)
 Sleeping Girl (17th century painting)